The Commissioner of the St. Louis Metropolitan Police Department (SLMPD) is the Commissioner of Police of the St. Louis Metropolitan Police Department.

The post is currently held by Commissioner Colonel Robert J. Tracy who was appointed on  December 14, 2022 and assumed office on January 9, 2023.

List of Commissioners of Police

See also

 List of law enforcement agencies in Missouri

References

External links
Celebrating 200 Years of Service, SLMPD, 2008

St Louis
Metropolitan Police Department, City of St. Louis